Graham Paul Thorpe,  (born 1 August 1969) is a former English cricketer who played for England internationally and Surrey domestically. A left-handed middle-order batsman and slip fielder, he appeared in 100 Test matches.

Early life

Thorpe was born the third and final son out of three boys in Farnham, Surrey, in August 1969. Naturally right-handed, when he was six years old Thorpe changed his stance to make it harder for his two elder brothers to get him out and because the boundary in his garden was shorter on the leg-side for a left-hander.

International career

Thorpe made his debut for Surrey in 1988, and his international debut in 1993. He scored a century (114 not out) in the second innings of his debut Test match, against Australia at Trent Bridge. Developing into a very highly regarded player, he was named as one of the Wisden Cricketers of the Year in 1998. Thorpe hit only one four in his hundred against Pakistan at Lahore in November 2000. It also contained seven threes, 12 twos and 51 singles. He hit another boundary before being dismissed for 118 from 301 balls. This is among the fewest ever boundaries in a Test century. However, Thorpe was also a highly capable stroke-maker: during his highest Test score, 200 not out off 231 balls against New Zealand at Christchurch in 2002, he and Andrew Flintoff compiled a partnership of 281 in 51 overs.

During the 2002 season, Thorpe had marital difficulties which were well publicised in several tabloid newspapers, and this seriously affected his play and his focus on the game. Seemingly disillusioned with constant touring away from his family, he announced his retirement from the one-day game and changed his mind several times on whether to tour Australia, eventually pulling out of the tour entirely. However, in 2003 Thorpe, with family problems put to one side, returned to the England team in the fifth Test against South Africa at his home ground of The Oval, where he was warmly welcomed as a local hero with a standing ovation. Thorpe scored 124 as England won the match to force an unlikely series draw, and remained in the side for series victories against Bangladesh away and at home, against the West Indies away and at home, against New Zealand at home, and in South Africa. He played his hundredth and final Test against Bangladesh in June 2005; in the two years between his comeback and his retirement he scored 1635 Test runs at an average of 56.37. He witnessed both of Brian Lara's marathon innings of 375 in 1994 and 400* in 2004.

Thorpe announced his retirement from Test cricket after the England selectors chose Kevin Pietersen instead of him for the first Test of The Ashes in July 2005. Thorpe averaged over 49 against Australia, but given the impending back complaint and 2005/2006 winter tour unavailability the selectors felt the decision to replace Thorpe with Pietersen the correct one. After announcing the squad England chairman of selectors David Graveney described it as "the most difficult decision that I have been party to in my time as a selector".

International centuries
During his career Thorpe made 16 centuries in international cricket, all 16 of which were scored in Tests, sits hundred and two in the list of century-makers in international cricket.

Key
 *  Remained not out
   Man of the match
   Captain of England in that match

Test cricket centuries

Domestic career
Thorpe played another two months with Surrey before following up his test retirement with his retirement from domestic cricket in August 2005. He served New South Wales as a batting coach in two seasons starting in 2005/6 and played for UTS-Balmain in the Sydney First Grade competition. Thorpe was named as assistant coach of New South Wales in 2007 replacing Matthew Mott who was promoted to the position of coach.

Post–playing career

Thorpe was created a Member of the Order of the British Empire (MBE) on 17 June 2006. He made his debut as a summariser for BBC Radio's Test Match Special programme during the first Test of India's 2007 tour of England. He also appeared as a match summariser on Sky Sports' highlights coverage for the same series. He wrote a monthly column for the UK-based cricket magazine, SPIN World Cricket Monthly. 

Thorpe was involved as batting coach for the England team between 2010 and 2022. Thorpe stepped down as England batting coach in February 2022 following their 4-0 Ashes defeat by Australia. In March 2022, Thorpe was made head coach of Afghanistan.

Personal life
Thorpe is married to Amanda.

In May 2022, it was revealed that Thorpe had been hospitalised for a "serious illness" with an "unclear prognosis".

References

External links

1969 births
Living people
England One Day International cricketers
England Test cricketers
English cricketers of 1969 to 2000
Cricketers at the 1996 Cricket World Cup
Cricketers at the 1999 Cricket World Cup
Cricketers who made a century on Test debut
English cricketers
Surrey cricketers
Wisden Cricketers of the Year
Members of the Order of the British Empire
People from Farnham
English cricket coaches
Marylebone Cricket Club cricketers
Test and County Cricket Board Under-25s XI cricketers